or Fresh PreCure!, is a Japanese magical girl anime series and the sixth in the Pretty Cure metaseries by Izumi Todo, featuring the fourth generation of Cures. Produced by Toei Animation, the series was directed by Junji Shimizu (Jigoku Sensei Nube The Movie) and written by Atsushi Maekawa (Bakugan Battle Brawlers, Jewelpet). Character designs were created by Hisashi Kagawa (Saikano, Bomberman Jetters, Phantom Thief Jeanne). The series aired on TV Asahi's ANN network between February 1, 2009 and January 31, 2010, replacing Yes! PreCure 5 Go Go! in its initial time slot, and was succeeded by HeartCatch PreCure!.

Fresh Pretty Cure marks the franchise's first ever expansion outside its target-audience demographic of young girls, as well as the first to introduce CG-animated end credits focused on dance routines. The series' main topic is happiness and dance, with playing-card suits, fruits and clovers for the Cure's main motif.

Story
Love Momozono is a 14-year-old student at Yotsuba Junior High School who at her own expense, one day, visits a show by the well-known Trinity dance company and decides to become a dancer. A series of events unfolds, leading her to begin her life as a protector of all worlds (and to compete in the dance contest).

Characters

Fresh Pretty Cure
 

A 14-year-old hapless matchmaker who is a fan of the Trinity dance company and is being taught to dance by Miyuki (the leader of Trinity, grateful for Love's saving her in the first episode). Love forms Clover (a dance group) with childhood friends Miki and Inori, and later, Setsuna. Love has messy, shoulder-length blond hair which she wears in two tight ponytails. As Cure Peach, her hair becomes knee-length, crimped blond twintails. Peach's colors are pink and white, her symbol is the heart, and her fruit motif is the peach. She introduces herself by saying "The pink heart is the symbol of love! Freshly-picked, Cure Peach!" (ピンクのハートは愛ある印。もぎたてフレッシュ、キュアピーチ！ Pinku no hāto wa ai aru shirushi. Mogitate Furesshu, Kyua Pīchi!)

 

A 15-year-old schoolgirl at Torigoe Academy for exceptionally talented performers. She is good at sports, has fashion sense, tries to be modest about her appearance and wants to be a fashion model. Her house is also a beauty salon, where she lives with her mother. Miki joins Love's dance group to maintain her weight. She has long, silky, lavender-colored hair that falls to her waist. As Cure Berry, her hair becomes lighter in color and she has a curly side ponytail. Berry's theme colors are blue and purple, her symbol is the spade, and her fruit motif is the blueberry. She introduces herself by saying "The blue heart is the symbol of hope! Freshly-gathered, Cure Berry!" (ブルーのハートは希望の印。つみたてフレッシュ、キュアベリー! Burū no hāto wa kibō no shirushi. Tsumitate furesshu, Kyua Berī!)

 

A 13-year-old student at White Clover Academy, an animal lover who wants to be a veterinarian. Love sometimes calls her "Buki", a diminutive of her family name. Although Inori appears calm and quiet, she suffers from low self-esteem. To improve herself, she joins Love's dance group. Inori sometimes lacks common sense and follows whatever situation in which she finds herself. Her hair is golden orange, brightening to golden blond when she is in Cure Pine form. Pine's colors are yellow and orange, her symbol is the diamond, and her fruit motif is the pineapple. She introduces herself by saying "The yellow heart is the symbol of prayers! Freshly-harvested, Cure Pine!" (イエローハートは祈りの印! とれたてフレッシュ, キュアパイン! Ierō Hāto wa Inori no Shirushi! Toretate Furesshu, Kyua Pain!)

  

Love’s enemy turned close friend, Eas begins as a cold, isolated teenage soldier loyal only to Moebius. After spending time with the girls as Moebius' spy, she begins to wonder what would make her happy and slowly opens up to them. After a battle with Cure Peach in which she finally discovered happiness, Eas dies as a result of reaching the end of a predetermined lifespan; however, she is saved by the Akarun and Chiffon and reborn as Cure Passion. She lives with the Momozono family under the pseudonym, joins the dance group and attends Yotsuba Junior High School with Love. She has dark purple hair as Setsuna, bluish-white hair as Eas and long, fluffy light-pink hair as Cure Passion. Her colors are red and black, her symbols are hearts and clovers, and her fruit motif is the passion fruit. She introduces herself by saying "The scarlet heart is the proof of happiness! Freshly-ripened, Cure Passion!" (真っ赤なハートは幸せの証！熟れたてフレッシュ、キュアパッション！ Makka na hāto wa shiawase no akashi! Uretate furesshu, Kyua Passhon!)

Sweets Kingdom
The  is a parallel world from where this season's fairies originate.

A ferret-like fairy, Tart is Chiffon's caretaker who has trouble caring for her. He is anxious but kind, with a Kansai dialect. Tart brings Chiffon to the human world from the Kingdom of Sweets in his search for the Pretty Cures. He worries and grumbles, but is moved by a good story and enjoys Kaoru's donuts. Tart is a prince in the Sweets Kingdom, who went to the human world and is engaged to Azukina.

 

A baby fairy from the Sweets Kingdom, Chiffon enjoys practical jokes. She uses "espers power" (ESP—magic with a green aura) to give people troubles or joy. Love and the others (including Tart) care for her. A mark on her forehead is a light with a number of abilities, including giving the Pretty Cures power to transform.

A tall, squirrel-like fairy and Tart's fiancée, from a kingdom near the Kingdom of Sweets. To unite these kingdoms, a marriage was arranged between her and Tart (crown prince of the Kingdom of Sweets). They have a close relationship, and are attracted to each other. When Tart goes to the human world with Chiffon to search for the Pretty Cures, Azukina worries and is relieved when he returns for a short visit with the Pretty Cures.

The elder of the Kingdom of Sweets who found and raised Chiffon.

Waffle is the king of the Sweets Kingdom and Tart’s father.

Madeline is the queen of the Sweets Kingdom and Tart’s mother.

Labyrinth
Their names are derived from the cardinal points of the compass.

A demon who is the leader of Labyrinth. He wishes to rule all worlds, considering his subjects mindless pawns. In episode 49, it is revealed that Moebius is a robot; the real Moebius is a supercomputer that hypnotized its creators (the people of Labyrinth).
 

A superficially attractive man who becomes comic relief later in the series. He seems to have romantic feelings for Eas, and is the most affected by her betrayal of Moebius. Westar's theme color is yellow. He and Soular die fighting Cure Berry and Cure Passion when they are sucked into a black hole. Soular and Westar are later brought back to life by Chiffon to help the Pretty Cures.
 

A calm and reserved man who plans his attacks before going on a mission, and his theme color is sea-green.
 

The highest-ranking member of Labyrinth, who is summoned by Moebius to retrieve Infinity after he deems Westar and Soular useless. She is later revealed to have been created by Moebius from the DNA of a plant.

An elder-looking man who is an aide of Moebius and monitors the people of Labyrinth. He is later revealed to have been created by Moebius from the DNA of a lizard.

Cures' families

Love's father, Ayumi’s husband, and Setsuna’s adoptive father who is a sales manager for a wig company.

Love's mother, Keitaro’s wife, and Setsuna’s adoptive mother who works part time at a supermarket. Like her daughter, she is a picky eater who hates spinach. She sees Setsuna, after the latter's defection, as a second daughter after she begins living with them.

A tatami craftsman who was Love's late grandfather and Ayumi’s late father who died before the events of the season.

A former model and salon owner who is Miki and Kazuki's divorced mother. Her ex-husband, is a music producer who has a significant role in the novel adaptation.

Miki's 13-year-old younger brother who lives with his father after their parents' divorce. Miki often persuades him to go out with her, disguised as her boyfriend to keep other boys away. He has had low blood pressure since birth, and dreams of being a doctor.

Inori's father who owns a veterinarian clinic. Bold and generous, he is patient with animals and a great influence on Inori.

Inori's mother who is an assistant at her husband's clinic.

Clover Town Street
 is a shopping street where the three major Cures live.

 

The leader of the  dance trio, who is Love's group-dance coach (whom she rescued, and admires).

A donut salesman who, when Love and friends are upset, he has a mysterious past with multiple careers.

A brash, stubborn baseball player who is Miyuki's younger brother. He is a classmate and close friend of Love; although they often quarrel, he secretly helps her.

A classmate of Love who is attracted to Miki, though the latter has no interest in dating.

A classmate of Love who is the heir to the Mikoshiba Zaibatsu. Tall, gentle, bespectacled and timid, he seems to like Inori.

 and 

The other two members of Trinity.

Guest Characters

The comedy duo.

Movie Characters

She is a stuffed bunny which Love had and played as a child.

The main antagonist of the film. He is made up of abandoned toys. He wants to get revenge on children for loving and forgetting their toys.

The secondary antagonist of the film. He is Toymajin’s worker who sends the cures into four different games.

Media

Anime

The anime series was directed by Junji Shimizu and Akifumi Zako, and aired in Japan on ABC and other ANN stations between February 1, 2009 and January 31, 2010. It has four pieces of theme music: two opening and two ending themes. A major change for the ending movies is a dance choreography by the Fresh Pretty Cure members, making it as a mainstray for the Pretty Cure franchise.

The anime later reaired on TV Asahi's cable channel, TeleAsa Channel 1, in April 2018.

Films
A film, based on the series, entitled   premiered in Japan October 31, 2009. The heroines also appeared in Pretty Cure All Stars films, beginning with  released March 14, 2009.

Video games
A video game based on the series, titled , was released by Bandai for the Nintendo DS on October 29, 2009.

Reception
Despite being a shift on the franchise's formula, the series was a success back in the 2009, which saved the franchise from its cancellation. Series headwritter Atsushi Maekawa stated on the Pretty Cure Thanksgiving Screening Event vol. 2 in Japan that "Fresh was a new experimental work, and it was my first time participating in the series, so it was a case of trial and error over and over again. If Fresh had failed, the series would've ended there. If it was a success, it would've continued forever... that was the high hurdle."

References

External links
Toei Animation's Fresh Pretty Cure! site 
ABC's Fresh Pretty Cure! site 
Fresh Pretty Cure! movie site

2010 Japanese television series endings
2010 comics endings
2009 anime films
Kodansha manga
Pretty Cure
Magical girl anime and manga
TV Asahi original programming
Toei Animation television
Toei Animation films
Dance in anime and manga